SanTan Village is an open-air, super regional lifestyle center located in Gilbert, Arizona that spans  of gross leasable area. It sits at the core of a  project that, upon planned full build out, will encompass  of retail, restaurants, entertainment, office space, residential and hotel uses. It was the last mall to be developed by Westcor and is still owned by Macerich.

The mall's anchors include Dillard's, Macy's, Harkins Theaters 16-Plex Cinema, Dick's Sporting Goods, Best Buy, and Barnes & Noble.

The SanTan Village Marketplace, located south of the mall, is an urban village mixed with many other retail and restaurant areas designed for urban shopping.

References 

Shopping malls in Maricopa County, Arizona
Gilbert, Arizona
Macerich
Shopping malls in Arizona
Shopping malls established in 2007